Nogometni klub Grafičar Ljubljana, commonly referred to as NK Grafičar or simply Grafičar, was a Slovenian football club from Ljubljana. They have won the Ljubljana-Littoral League in 1956. The club then merged with Svoboda in the late 1950s.

Association football clubs established in 1948
Defunct football clubs in Slovenia
Football clubs in Yugoslavia
Football clubs in Ljubljana
1948 establishments in Slovenia